Yana Vladimirovna Pavlova (born 6 January 1996) is a Russian individual and synchronised trampoline gymnast, representing her nation at international competitions.

Career
She began training in 2006 in Krasnodar, Russia. She made her international debut for Russia in 2013 at a World Cup. She competed at world championships, including at the 2013, 2014 and 2015 Trampoline World Championships. In 2015 she won the bronze medal in the team trampoline event. 
At the 2015 European Games in Baku she won the gold medal in both the individual event and the synchronised event with Anna Kornetskaya.
She competed at the 2016 Summer Olympics.

Personal
She did a study coaching at the Kuban State University of Physical Education, Sport and Tourism in Krasnodar, Russia. She holds the title of Master of Sport of International Class in Russia.

References

External links
 
 
 

1996 births
Living people
Russian female trampolinists
Place of birth missing (living people)
Gymnasts at the 2015 European Games
European Games gold medalists for Russia
European Games medalists in gymnastics
Gymnasts at the 2016 Summer Olympics
Olympic gymnasts of Russia
Medalists at the Trampoline Gymnastics World Championships
Gymnasts at the 2019 European Games
European Games bronze medalists for Russia
21st-century Russian women